Jennifer Dorothy June "Jenn" Wakefield (born June 15, 1989) is a Canadian ice hockey player and coach, currently playing in the Swedish Women's Hockey League (SDHL) with MoDo Hockey Dam. She has served as an assistant coach to the Netherlands' women's national ice hockey team and the women's representative team of Almtuna IS in the Damettan. As a member of the Canadian national ice hockey team, she was a substitute for the roster that participated in 2010 Winter Olympics and played on the gold-medal winning team at the 2014 Winter Olympics, and the silver-medal winning team at the 2018 Winter Olympics.

Playing career

Junior years
Wakefield won a gold medal with Team Ontario at the 2007 Canada Winter Games. She led the tournament in scoring with twenty points (twelve goals and eight assists). In a game versus Newfoundland at the Canada Winter Games (March 5, 2007), Wakefield was on a line with Mallory Deluce and Rebecca Johnston. The three combined for 12 points in a 19–0 victory. She won a silver medal at the Ontario Women's Hockey Association provincial championships in 2006 with the Durham West Jr. Lightning of the PWHL. Wakefield played for Team Ontario Red at the 2005 National Women's Under-18 Championship and was part of the gold medal winning team.

CWHL
Wakefield played one season (2009–10) for the Vaughan Flames in the Canadian Women's Hockey League. Returning to the CWHL after graduating from Boston University, she would be the 12th overall selection by the Toronto Furies in the 2012 CWHL Draft. Wakefield made her CWHL debut on October 20, 2012, a 4–3 win at Brampton. The following day, she scored the first two goals of her CWHL career. Assisted by Chaterine White, said goal was scored against Florence Schelling, who was in her CWHL debut. In the third period, she would score her second goal of the game, assisted by Jenny Brine and Shannon Moulson. In addition, Wakefield was recognized as the Second Star of the Game. Her performance against Brampton marked the start of a five-game scoring streak, which culminated on November 18, 2012, versus Team Alberta.

In the aftermath of a 4–3 home loss against the Boston Blades on October 27, 2012, Wakefield was named Third Star of the Game, having scored a pair of goals in the third period.

The first game-winning goal of her CWHL career was scored on November 24, 2012, a road contest against the Montreal Stars. Said goal was scored against Charline Labonté. On January 12, 2013, Wakefield recorded her first career hat trick in CWHL play, including the game-winning goal, recording the feat against Brampton Thunder goaltender Liz Knox.

Hockey Canada
After being cut from the Olympic team in December 2009 due to a broken hand, Wakefield played for the Canadian Under 22 team that participated in the MLP Cup in 2010. She scored a goal in the Gold Medal win over Switzerland that was played on January 9, 2010. She played in the 2014 Winter Olympics for Canada.

NCAA

University of New Hampshire
Her freshman year was in 2007–08. Wakefield finished second in New Hampshire scoring, but led all New Hampshire freshmen in scoring. She helped New Hampshire reach the NCAA Frozen Four. As a sophomore, Wakefield led New Hampshire in scoring. In addition, Wakefield led the Wildcats with 13 power play goals, four shorthanded goals and nine game-winning goals.

Boston University
In January 2010, it was announced that Wakefield will play for the Boston University Terriers women's ice hockey program.
December 7 and 10: In wins over Northeastern and Harvard, Wakefield recorded four points (2g, 2a) in wins over Northeastern and Harvard. On December 7, Wakefield had one goal and two assists as the Terriers defeated the Huskies by a 3–0 mark. She recorded 13 shots on goal in the two games.
In December 2010, Wakefield recorded seven points in just three games. She was part of the Terriers earning back-to-back Hockey East shutouts with three points, including a power-play and game-winning goal, in a 4–0 win against the Connecticut Huskies. In a 3–0 triumph over Northeastern, Wakefield scored a goal (in which she launched a game-high 11 shots). In the month's final game, Wakefield netted a goal and two assists as the Terriers defeated the Harvard Crimson for the first time in program history.
On January 15 and 16, 2011, Wakefield recorded three goals and three assists in games against Boston College and Maine. In the win against Boston College, she had a four-point effort (2 goals, 2 assists) as she was part of all four points in a 4–0 win over the Eagles
March 12, 2011: Wakefield scored two goals, including an empty net goal with twelve seconds left, as BU defeated Mercyhurst in the NCAA regional playoff.
May 7, 2011: Wakefield was named captain of the Terriers for the 2011–12 season.
November 2, 2011: In a 4–1 defeat of rival Boston College, Wakefield scored her 100th career goal. With the accomplishment, she became the first Hockey East women's player to reach the 100 goal mark. Wakefield scored 59 goals in two seasons at New Hampshire (59 goals) before transferring to Boston University, where she netted 41 goals to reach the milestone.

Sweden
In the 2013–14 season, she played with Munksund-Skuthamn SK in the Swedish Women's Hockey League (SDHL).
In 2014–15, she played with Linköping HC Dam in the SDHL and IK Guts in the men's Hockeytvåan.
In 2015–16, she continued with Linköping HC of the SDHL and played with Borås HC in the men's Hockeyettan.
 In the 2016–17 season, Wakefield played 30 regular season and five playoff games with Linköping HC in the SDHL and one game with the Nybro Flames of the Hockeytvåan. 
 In the 2017–18 season, she played six regular season and seven playoff games in the SDHL with Luleå HF/MSSK .
In the 2018–19 season, she played nine SDHL regular season games with Brynäs IF.
In the 2019–20 season, she played thirty regular season and four playoff games in the SDHL with Djurgårdens IF.
She is signed with Linköping HC for the 2020–21 SDHL season.

Career statistics

Awards and honours
2008 Hockey East Rookie of the Year
2008 Hockey East First All-Star Team
2008 Hockey East All-Tournament Team
2008 Hockey East All-Academic Team
Top-10 finalist for the 2009 Patty Kazmaier Memorial Award
Hockey East Player of the Month in December 2008
Hockey East Player of the Month in April 2009
Hockey East Pure Hockey Player of the Week (Week of October 4, 2010)
Hockey East Pure Hockey Player of the Week (Week of December 13, 2010) 
Hockey East Pure Hockey Player of the Month (December 2010)
Hockey East Pure Hockey Player of the Week (Week of January 17, 2011)
Hockey East Player of the Week (Week of October 3, 2011)
2011 Patty Kazmaier Award Nominee
2011 Hockey East All-Tournament team 
2011 New England Women's Division I All-Star selection
Hockey East Player of the Month (Month of October 2011)
Hockey East Player of the Week (Week of January 23, 2012)
Hockey East Player of the Month (Month of January 2012)
Hockey East Player of the Week (Week of February 27, 2012)
Hockey East Scoring Champion (2011–12)
Hockey East 10th Anniversary Team selection

References

External links
 
 
 
 

1989 births
Boston University Terriers women's ice hockey players
Canadian expatriate sportspeople in Sweden
Canadian expatriate ice hockey players in the United States
Canadian women's ice hockey forwards
Ice hockey players at the 2014 Winter Olympics
Ice hockey players at the 2018 Winter Olympics
Living people
Medalists at the 2014 Winter Olympics
Medalists at the 2018 Winter Olympics
New Hampshire Wildcats women's ice hockey players
Olympic gold medalists for Canada
Olympic ice hockey players of Canada
Olympic silver medalists for Canada
Olympic medalists in ice hockey
Sportspeople from Scarborough, Toronto
Ice hockey people from Toronto
Toronto Furies players
Luleå HF/MSSK players
Djurgårdens IF Hockey Dam players
Linköping HC Dam players
Brynäs IF Dam players